Negash is a village in the Tigray Region of Ethiopia, which straddles the Adigrat to Mekelle road  north of Wukro. It is located in Wukro woreda.

History 

Negash is considered to be the earliest Muslim settlement in Africa; a cemetery from the 7th century CE has been excavated inside the village boundaries. The Futuh al-Habasha records Ahmad ibn Ibrahim al-Ghazi visited the tomb of Ashama ibn Abjar in Negash during his invasion of the province of Tigray (around 1537). Negash is also known for having one of Africa's oldest mosques, that is the Al Nejashi Mosque.

In 2020 during Tigray War, the Al Nejashi Mosque was heavily damaged from shelling and looting.

Demographics 
In the statistical tables of the 2007 census published by the Central Statistical Agency, the kebele Negash is located in is reported to have a total population of 7,753 of whom 3,607 are men and 4,146 women; they are distributed amongst 1,689 households in 1,626 housing units. Although it is known for its particular relationship with Islam, 98.2% of the population follows the Ethiopian Orthodox Tewahedo Church, the 1.1% of the population is Protestant, and the remaining 0.7% is Muslim.

See also 
 Islam in Africa
 Migration to Abyssinia
 Second migration to Abyssinia
 Northeast Africa

References 

Islam in Africa
Populated places in the Tigray Region